Don Reid (born December 30, 1973) is an American former professional basketball player who was selected by the Detroit Pistons in the second round (58th pick overall) of the 1995 NBA Draft. In his career, Reid played for the Pistons, Washington Wizards and Orlando Magic in 8 NBA seasons. In his 1995-96 rookie season as a member of the Pistons, he averaged 3.8 points in 69 games played. He played collegiately at Georgetown University.

References

External links
NBA stats @ basketballreference.com

1973 births
Living people
African-American basketball players
American men's basketball players
Basketball players from Washington, D.C.
Detroit Pistons draft picks
Detroit Pistons players
Georgetown Hoyas men's basketball players
Orlando Magic players
People from Largo, Maryland
Power forwards (basketball)
Washington Wizards players
21st-century African-American sportspeople
20th-century African-American sportspeople